Michael LaBelle (born September 21, 1989), is a web-based entertainer, video producer, and a professional FIFA player for New York Red Bulls, previously known by the pseudonyms michs09 and Dirty Mike. He is known mostly for providing tips via nontraditional methods through YouTube and Twitch outlets.

Playing career
LaBelle began his professional esports career in 2006 after qualifying for the World Final of the FIFA Interactive World Cup (FIWC). LaBelle has won seven national titles in FIFA, and represented the United States at the FIWC, ESWC (Electronic Sports World Cup), WCG (World Cyber Games), VG World Finals (Virgin Gaming), IeSF World Championship (International Esports Federation), WSVG (World Series of Video Games), Hyundai Global Championship, WCG Pan American Championship and as an ESL (Electronic Sports League) Major Series Player.

In 2018, LaBelle signed with the New York Red Bulls as an esports competitor.

Entertainer
Since May 2016, LaBelle's channel has grown to over 283,000 subscribers and received over 37 million total views. He has been featured in the Houston Chronicle and Houston Press. He has also been featured on TV shows WCG Ultimate Gamer  (Season 2) and Great Day Houston with Deborah Duncan on KHOU.

LaBelle had his celebration motion captured and featured in FIFA 14 (Le Cirque LaBelle).

He has also worked as a gaming analyst and host for KICKTV  and Copa90.

As of May 2016, LaBelle is sponsored by SteelSeries, G2A, and EGSPN.

Accomplishments
FIFA 15
ESWC Grand Final (Paris, France) - 9th-16th place
World Series of Video Games World Final (Maldives) - 5th-8th place
World Series of Video Games National Qualifier - 1st place

FIFA 14
KICK.TV Best Goal Competition - 1st place
KICK.TV World Cup Invitational - 5th-8th place

FIFA 13
Virgin Gaming Challenge Series World Final (Las Vegas, Nevada) - 32/256

FIFA 12
Gamestop Virgin Gaming $50,000 Final Bracket - 3rd/4th (Xbox 360)
Gamestop Virgin Gaming $50,000 Final Bracket - 5th-8th place (PS3)
Virgin Gaming Challenge Series World Final (Manhattan, New York) - 64/256
WCG Pan American Championship (Santiago, Chile) - 5th-8th place

FIFA 11
IeSF World Championship (Andong, Korea) - 5th-8th place
WCG Pan American Championship (São Paulo, Brazil) - 4th place

FIFA 10
Hyundai Global FIFA Championship (Busan, Korea) - 9th -16th place
IeSF Challenge World Championship (Daegu, Korea) - Group

FIFA 09
ESL Major Series Player
FIWC National Final (Manhattan, New York) - 2nd place
Gillette Tournament of Champions Finals - 4th place
WCG Grand Final (Chengdu, China) - Group
WCG National Final (Manhattan, New York) - 2nd place 
WCG National Final Qualifier (West Region) - 1st place
WCG US Open Invitational (Manhattan, New York) - 3rd place

FIFA 08
CGS Taxi player for Chicago Chimera (Championship Gaming Series)
FIWC Grand Final (Berlin, Germany) - 9th-16th place
FIWC North American Regional (Los Angeles, California) - 1st place 
WCG Grand Final (Cologne, Germany) - Group

FIFA 07
FIWC Grand Finalist (Amsterdam, Netherlands) - 9th-16th place

Personal life
LaBelle was born on September 21, 1989, in Houston, Texas. As a child, he played games such as Duck Hunt and Mario Kart.

References

1989 births
Living people
FIFA (video game series) players
American esports players
People from Houston